The Local Government Areas Amalgamation Act 1980 (NSW) was an Act of the Parliament of New South Wales, which amended the Local Government Act 1919, with the purpose of amalgamating a series of local government areas in New South Wales. The amalgamations took effect from 1 January 1981.

The Act 
Schedule 1 of the Act lists the areas to be amalgamated and the status of the new area (i.e. Shire or Municipality). The only area to be split by the Act was the Manning Shire, divided between the Shire of Great Lakes and the newly created Municipality of Greater Taree.

Councils amalgamated

Municipalities

Shires

Repeal 
The Act was repealed by the Statute Law (Miscellaneous Provisions) Act 2011.

See also 

 List of local government areas in New South Wales
 List of former local government areas in New South Wales

References

1980 in Australian law
New South Wales legislation
Local government areas of New South Wales
1980s in New South Wales
History of local government in Australia
Local government legislation in Australia